Srinivasan Rangarajan (10 April 1936 – 8 February 2007) was an Indian journalist, entrepreneur, cricketer, film producer and socialite. He is the youngest son of K. Srinivasan and grandson of S. Kasturi Ranga Iyengar.

Early life 

Rangarajan was born in Madras to K. Srinivasan, Editor and Managing Director of The Hindu on 10 April 1936. He studied in Madras and became a Director in The Hindu in 1958.

As film producer
Gauravam (1973)
Vasandhathil Oru Naal (1981)
Kanmaniye Pesu (1985)
Lakshmi Vandhachu (1986)
Ore Oru Gramathiley (1987)

References 

 

1936 births
2007 deaths
The Hindu journalists
Tamil film producers
Indian male journalists
Producers who won the Best Film on Other Social Issues National Film Award